Caprivi Liberation Army (CLA) is a Namibian rebel and separatist group which was established in 1994 to separate the Caprivi Strip, a region mainly inhabited by the Lozi people. It operates only in the Caprivi strip.

Background
The Caprivi Strip is located in far northeast of Namibia. The region is a panhandle of Namibia eastwards about 450 km, between Botswana on the south, Angola and Zambia to the north, and Kavango Region. During the "Scramble for Africa" period, Great Britain ceded the territory to Germany in order for the latter to have access to the Zambezi River and to reach its other colonies in east Africa while keeping possession of German South-West Africa.

The Caprivi strip was of strategic military importance. It saw continual military actions and multiple incursions by various armed forces using the Strip as a corridor to access other territories. Those military actions were mainly handled by many South African factions during the Rhodesian Bush War (1970–1979). It was also a battlefield for the African National Congress and SWAPO operations against the South African government (1965–1994) and the UNITA operations during the Angolan Civil War.

Formation and activities of the CLA
The front was created in February 1994 as a separatist group under the goal of joining the Lozi people, who are present in neighbouring Botswana, Zambia, and Angola, together.
Since 1998 it has been under the leadership of Mishake Muyongo who has been expelled from the Democratic Turnhalle Alliance of Namibia (DTA) as a result of his support for the secession of his home region.

In August 1999 the CLA launched many surprise attacks on police stations and many military posts in Katima Mulilo before the Namibian government imposed a state of emergency in the eastern part of the Caprivi Strip and beat the rebels. Fourteen rebels were reported dead and as many as 200 were arrested and jailed.

The last military ambush was executed in September 1999 where three members were killed in a shoot-out. The leader Muyongo was granted asylum in Denmark.

References

External links

1994 establishments in Namibia
Rebel groups in Namibia
Separatism in Namibia
Military history of Namibia